Michael Richard Adair (born January 19, 1958) is a former pitching coach for the Baltimore Orioles and a former minor league baseball player.  He was succeeded as pitching coach by Bill Castro.

Playing career
As a player, Adair played college baseball at Western Carolina University and was drafted by the Seattle Mariners in the third round of the 1979 Major League Baseball Draft. Injuries ended his career seven years later, having peaked at the Triple-A level.

Coaching career
He has held various coaching jobs since the end of his playing career, mostly as a minor-league pitching coach, with the Cleveland Indians, San Diego Padres, Detroit Tigers, Atlanta Braves, and Toronto Blue Jays organizations. He held major league coaching jobs with Cleveland, Detroit, and Seattle. Prior to being appointed to his former position with Seattle, Adair spent four seasons as a minor-league pitching coordinator for the Texas Rangers.

He was suspended on September 11, 1997, for 2 games after a postgame confrontation with the umpires.

Adair served as pitching coach for the Seattle Mariners. In 2011, he was hired as the bullpen coach for the Baltimore Orioles. Adair took over pitching coach Mark Connor's position after the latter resigned on June 14.  In August 2013 Adair went on a leave of absence, due to personal reasons, from his post as the pitching coach and was succeeded by Bill Castro.

Personal
Adair is the nephew of former MLB pitcher and pitching coach Art Fowler.

References

External links

1958 births
Living people
Major League Baseball pitching coaches
Major League Baseball bullpen coaches
Cleveland Indians coaches
Detroit Tigers coaches
Seattle Mariners coaches
Baltimore Orioles coaches
Alexandria Mariners players
Lynn Sailors players
Wausau Timbers players
Salt Lake City Gulls players
Chattanooga Lookouts players